Ian C. Gibb (c. 1925 – January 12, 1983) was a Canadian football player who played for the Winnipeg Blue Bombers.

References

1920s births
1983 deaths
Canadian football running backs
People from Saint Boniface, Winnipeg
Players of Canadian football from Manitoba
Canadian football people from Winnipeg
Winnipeg Blue Bombers players